Issa Jamil Kassissieh (born 1964) is a Palestinian scholar and diplomat, who since January 2017 serves as Palestinian ambassador to the Holy See and to the Sovereign Military Order of Malta.

Early life
Issa Kassissieh was born in East Jerusalem into a Greek-Orthodox family. He studied English literature at Bethlehem University, international relations at Birzeit University, public administration at the Kennedy School of Government and diplomacy at the University of Birmingham.

Diplomatic career
Kassissieh served in various positions involving negotiations on behalf of the PLO and the Palestinian Authority. He served as director of International Relations department at the Orient House, Jerusalem. Later, he joined the staff of Negotiations Affairs Department of the Palestinian Authority, and was mostly involved in negotiations with churches and on issues relating to the problem of Jerusalem. He was appointed Palestinian ambassador to the Holy See in January 2017.

References

External links
 CV of Issa Kassissieh at the Palestinian Embassy to the Vatican website

1964 births
Living people
Date of birth missing (living people)
People from Jerusalem
Birzeit University alumni
Alumni of the University of Birmingham
Harvard Kennedy School alumni
Ambassadors of the State of Palestine to the Holy See